Keble College is one of the constituent colleges of the University of Oxford.  It was founded in memory of the Anglican clergyman John Keble, who died in 1866, and was intended to cater for men whose financial resources were insufficient to enable them to study at one of the older Oxford colleges.  After a public appeal for donations in John Keble's memory, the college opened in 1870.  The college's buildings – which were quite unlike any previous Oxford college, with their use of coloured bricks in patterns – were designed by William Butterfield; there have been later additions as the college has grown.

The Governing Body of the college has the ability to elect "distinguished persons" to Honorary Fellowships. Under the current statutes of the college, Honorary Fellows cannot vote at meetings of the Governing Body and do not receive financial reward, but they receive "such other privileges as the Governing Body may determine." They can be called upon to help decide whether to dismiss or discipline members of academic staff (including the Warden of the college).

The first four Honorary Fellows were elected in 1931.  Two of them (Edward Talbot and Walter Lock) were former Wardens of the college; the other two, Sir Wilmot Herringham (a former Vice-Chancellor of the University of London) and Sir Reginald Craddock (a former Lieutenant-Governor of Burma), had studied at Keble College before achieving prominence in public life. Honorary Fellows have included former students (Old Members), Fellows, and Wardens, as well as some with no previous academic connection to the college.  In this latter group there are benefactors (for example Sir Anthony O'Reilly, elected 2002), and individuals of distinction such as former U.S. President Ronald Reagan (elected 1994) and the poet Sir John Betjeman (elected 1972).  Betjeman, who studied at Magdalen College, Oxford, was involved in Keble's centenary appeal in 1970: The Times said in its obituary of him that the Honorary Fellowship was particularly appropriate because of the college's "architectural and Anglican connotations", Betjeman having strong interests in both areas. As of July 2011, the longest-serving Honorary Fellows are Raoul Franklin and Dennis Nineham, both of whom were elected in 1980. The three longest-serving Honorary Fellows are Sir John Forsdyke (Principal Librarian of the British Museum; appointed 1937, died 1979), Sir Thomas Armstrong (conductor; appointed 1955, died 1994) and Harry Carpenter (Warden, later Bishop of Oxford; appointed 1960, died 1993).

Honorary Fellows
The abbreviations used in the "Link" column denote the person's connection with the college before election as an Honorary Fellow:
C – A member of the college council: the Warden and Council governed the college between 6 June 1870 (the date of incorporation) and 9 April 1952 (the date when the college's statutes were amended to make the college self-governing with control passing to the Warden and Fellows).
F – A former Fellow of the college
OM – An Old Member of the college
W – A former Warden of the college
A dash denotes that the person had no previous academic link with the college.

See also

List of members of the Council of Keble College, Oxford
List of Honorary Fellows of Jesus College, Oxford

References
Notes

Bibliography

Honorary Fellows
Honorary Fellows
Keble